Ambulance is a 2005 Danish action thriller film directed by Laurits Munch-Petersen, who co-wrote the film along with Lars Andreas Pedersen. It stars Paw Henriksen, Thomas Bo Larsen and Helle Fagralid. The film follows two brothers who commit a bank robbery and steal an ambulance as their getaway vehicle to escape cops chasing after them, only to discover a nurse and a patient in it. The film was released on 15 July 2005. In 2022, an American remake with the same name directed by Michael Bay was released.

Plot
Brothers Tim and Frank decide to rob a bank in order to arrange money for their mother's treatment. They enter the bank and rob the money, but Tim ends up firing a shot. This leads to chaos as the police arrive, and in attempt to flee them, the brothers steal an ambulance. During the pursuit, they throw away the GPS and later find out there is a nurse and a heart patient in the back of the ambulance. Tim and Frank enter a junkyard, where they find the getaway car arranged by Tim to be missing. As the cops arrive, they drive away the ambulance and attempt to steal a car, but a phone call from their mother as well as cops closing in on them prompts them to use the ambulance again. The nurse Julie frequently requests that the brothers help her and take the patient to the hospital; Tim shows sympathy while Frank remains focused on fleeing the cops.

Learning that a helicopter is chasing after them, they enter a forest and park the ambulance inside a barn. When the patient's pulse drops to zero, Tim and Julie begin operating with the help of experts over a phone call while Frank paints the ambulance black to avoid being noticed. Somehow, Tim and Julie manage to save the patient, but Frank decides to abandon the patient and Julie. Tim is against it, but is forced to do so. With only 25 minutes of oxygen left with the patient, Tim and Frank drive away from the forest. Tim calls an ambulance for Julie but is unable to pinpoint the location. He begins to resist and in an attempt to grab the gun Frank had been threatening him with, ends up crashing the ambulance into a tree, injuring himself and Frank in the process. Tim acquires the gun and forces Frank to drive the ambulance back into the woods in order to save the patient and send him to a hospital. After refueling the ambulance, they manage to arrive in the nick of time and save the patient from dying. 

Now on the road, Tim communicates with the police and tricks them into believing they will be dropping the patient and Julie at a hospital, while actually driving to a hospital in Fakse, so that they can drop the hostages elsewhere while the cops surround the other hospital. Arriving at the hospital, the ambulance accidentally barges into a police vehicle. Sensing a threat, Frank begins driving the ambulance, with its backdoors open and the patient hanging out of it. With all the stolen money flying out of the vehicle as well, the ambulance stops. Frank holds Julie at gunpoint while the cops aim at him. However, he soon points the gun at Tim, blaming him for everything that went wrong in his life. He is about to shoot him, before a female cop guns down Frank, who collapses in Tim's arms. Soon, the police arrive, cuffing Tim to the stretcher. The patient and Julie are finally saved, and just as Tim is being taken to the hospital, Julie, who had heard from Tim about his mother's condition, tells him she would try to help his mother.

Cast
Paw Henriksen as Tim
Thomas Bo Larsen as Frank
Helle Fagralid as Julie

References

External links 

2005 action thriller films
2005 crime thriller films
2000s chase films
2000s crime action films
2000s Danish-language films
Danish crime action films
Danish crime thriller films
Films about bank robbery
Films about brothers
Films about hijackings
Nordisk Film films